Jung Jae-hoon (Hangul: 정재훈, Hanja: 鄭載勳; born January 1, 1980, in Seoul, South Korea) is a South Korean starting pitcher who plays for the Doosan Bears in the Korea Baseball Organization.

Professional career

References

External links 
Career statistics and player information from Korea Baseball Organization

Jung Jae-hoon at Doosan Bears Baseball Club 

1980 births
Living people
South Korean baseball players
Doosan Bears players
Lotte Giants players
2006 World Baseball Classic players
Sungkyunkwan University alumni
KBO League pitchers